Don Budge and Gene Mako defeated the defending champions Pat Hughes and Raymond Tuckey in the final, 6–0, 6–4, 6–8, 6–1 to win the gentlemen doubles tennis title at the 1937 Wimbledon Championship.

Seeds

  Pat Hughes /  Raymond Tuckey (final)
  Don Budge /  Gene Mako (champions)
  Gottfried von Cramm /  Henner Henkel (semifinals)
  Jack Crawford /  Vivian McGrath (first round)

Draw

Finals

Top half

Section 1

Section 2

Bottom half

Section 3

Section 4

References

External links

Men's Doubles
Wimbledon Championship by year – Men's doubles